Kuda, also known as Kuda Technologies, is a fintech company operating in Nigeria and the UK. It was founded by Babs Ogundeyi and Musty Mustapha in 2019.

Kuda was listed as one of the seven WEF African technology startups of 2021.

Kuda is valued at $500 million and has raised over $90 million from investors including Target Global and Valar Ventures.

See also

 Economy of Nigeria
 List of banks in Nigeria

References

Online banks
Banks of Nigeria
Financial technology companies of Nigeria